Norman C.T. Liu is a Chinese-American business executive and former Senior Advisor to ICBC Leasing based in Beijing, China. During the fall of 2021, he was named President & CEO of Nordic Aviation Capital, the world's largest regional aircraft leasing firm, with operations in Ireland, Denmark, Singapore, Hong Kong, Beijing, Toronto and Fort Lauderdale, Florida.

Liu also currently serves as a Senior Advisor to Global Infrastructure Partners, a Board Member of GA Telesis and an adjunct professor at the Graduate Business School of University College Dublin.

He was formerly the Chairman, President & CEO of GE Capital Aviation Services (GECAS) based in London and Singapore until his retirement in December 2016. He was a veteran of GE Capital, a primary unit of General Electric to which GECAS was grouped. He assumed the CEO position at GECAS in July 2009. GECAS was the world's largest aircraft financing firm during his tenure with AUM of over $55 billion.

Liu graduated from Yale in 1979 and obtained an MBA from Harvard in 1982.

References

External links
GE Capital Bio

American people of Chinese descent
General Electric people
Living people
Harvard Business School alumni
Yale University alumni
Members of Committee of 100
Year of birth missing (living people)